In the United Kingdom, an emergency control centre or emergency communications centre (ECC) is a building or room where control room operators receive incoming telephone calls from members of the public in need of assistance. Callers make initial contact through the 999 emergency telephone service, where their calls are answered at an operator assistance centre (OAC). From here the telephone company's operator directs the call to the relevant ECC.

Emergency services using ECC
The single greatest use of United Kingdom ECCs is made by police forces, but there are four principal emergency services which maintain full-time ECC provision, nationwide. These are the police, ambulance services, fire and rescue services, and the Coastguard. A number of additional emergency services make use of the ECC of one of the four full-time services; for example, mountain rescue are contacted through police ECCs, and the lifeboat service is contacted through Coastguard ECCs.

History
Types of centralised control have been in use since the beginning of emergency services in Britain, but the first to respond to the 999 number was in 1937 in the London area. Prior to this time there were assorted basic means of communication with centralised control, including operations rooms with telephones, maps, direct lines to police boxes, and radios. Over time as technology has advanced more equipment is used in dealing with calls. Today technology is used to pinpoint the location of the caller, advanced logging systems are used to record conversations and events, should they be needed as evidence, and live records are kept of the locations of all units on patrol to co-ordinate effective responses to tasks.

Operation
Control room operators usually work in teams on variable shift patterns. Emergency control centres are open twenty-four hours a day, all year round, and are usually busiest on Friday and Saturday nights. Being staffed twenty-four hours a day requires large numbers of staff, typically around 80 operators in an average size jurisdiction.

Cleveland Police are the only force in the UK that have a privately run ECC.

India
In India, Police Control Room(PCR) is a place or room where communications between different levels of police setup takes place. Police control room is also bridge between general public who inform or seek help from police by dialling number"100" or one hundred. It can be called as police helpline number in Bharat(India). Even though the number "100" is primarily meant for informing or help by police, common people of India use it for many purposes including help during disasters, traffic jams, counselling among others. Most of districts in Bharat have a police control room. Normally police commissionerates also have separate police control room(pcr). There are police vehicles which patrol designated areas under police control room and are popularly known as PCR vans or PCR vehicles. These PCR vehicles have police personnel in them to assist people as quickly as possible. Some states of India have fancy names for PCR vehicles.

These days there are many helpline numbers for different purposes in India, but police helpline number"100" is most popular and easily remembered.

See also 
 999 (emergency telephone number)
 Emergency telephone number
 Police 101 non-emergency number

References 

Law enforcement in the United Kingdom